Sanaga-Maritime is a department of Littoral Province in Cameroon. The department covers an area of 9,311 km and as of 2001 had a total population of 167,661. The capital of the department lies at Édéa.

Subdivisions
The department is divided administratively into 11 communes and in turn into villages.

Communes 
 Dizangué
 Dibamba
 Édéa (urban)
 Édéa (rural)
 Massock
 Mouanko
 Ndom
 Ngambe
 Ngwei
 Nyanon
 Pouma

References

Departments of Cameroon
Littoral Region (Cameroon)